Sarah A. Scott   is an archaeologist and academic. She is an Associate Professor of Archaeology at the University of Leicester. Scott has a BSc degree from Leicester and completed her DPhil at University of Oxford in 1992. She taught at the University of Durham before moving to Leicester. In 2015 she became a Senior Fellow of the Higher Education Academy and in 2016 was in receipt of Advance HE's National Teaching Fellowship award. Scott was elected as a Fellow of the Society of Antiquaries of London on 5 May 2002.

Select publications
Scott, S. 2019. "Vetusta Monumenta and Britain's Classical Past", Vetusta Monumenta: Ancient Monuments, A Digital Edition 
Savani, G., Scott, S. and Morris, M. 2018. Life in the Roman World: Roman Leicester. Leicester, University of Leicester.
Scott, S. 2017. "'Gratefully dedicated to the subscribers': The archaeological publishing projects and achievements of Charles Roach Smith". Internet Archaeology 45. 
Scott, S. 2014. "Britain in the classical world: Samuel Lysons and the art of Roman Britain 1780-1820". Classical Receptions Journal, 6 (2), 294–337. 
Scott, S. 2013. "Pioneers, publishers and the dissemination of archaeological knowledge. A study of publishing in archaeology 1816-1851". Internet Archaeology 35. 
Scott, S. 2006. "Art and the archaeologist". World Archaeology 38 (4), 628–643.
Scott, S. and Webster, J. eds 2003. Roman Imperialism and Provincial Art. Cambridge, Cambridge University Press.
Scott, S. 2000. Art and Society in Fourth-Century Britain (Oxford University School of Archaeology Monograph 53). Oxford Oxbow.

References

Living people
Place of birth missing (living people)
Fellows of the Society of Antiquaries of London
British archaeologists
British women archaeologists
20th-century archaeologists
21st-century archaeologists
Women classical scholars
Alumni of the University of Oxford
Academics of the University of Leicester
Senior Fellows of the Higher Education Academy
Year of birth missing (living people)